Glenns is a residential neighborhood in Columbus, Georgia.  In recent years, Glenns has been overrun with many new houses, with most ranging in the $300,000 range.  Many of the people residing there are of the Jewish faith.

References

Columbus metropolitan area, Georgia
Neighborhoods in Columbus, Georgia